Chikwawa is a town with a population of 6,114 according to the 2018 census located in the Southern Region of Malawi on the west bank of the Shire River. It is the administrative capital of the Chikwawa District.

Chikwawa, then known as Chibisa's village, was the first town in Malawi to be seen by European explorers, when visited in March   1859 by David Livingstone's second Zambesi expedition. Their way upstream was blocked by the Kapachira Falls, and they returned in August for land exploration which reached Lake Malawi on 18 September.

The surrounding region was ravaged by Portuguese slave traders in the nineteenth century.

The Majete Wildlife Reserve, the Mwabvi Wildlife Reserve and Lengwe National Park lie in the vicinity of Chikwawa. Large numbers of hippopotamus and crocodiles inhabit the Shire River area.

References

Populated places in Southern Region, Malawi